Hipster racism is engaging in behaviors typically regarded as racist and defending them as being performed ironically or satirically. Rachel Dubrofsky and Megan W. Wood have described it as being supposedly "too hip and self-aware to actually mean the racist stuff one expresses". This might include wearing blackface and other performances of stereotyped African Americans, use of the word nigger, and appropriating cultural dress. Talia Meer argues that hipster racism is rooted in what she calls "hipster exceptionalism", meaning "the idea that something ordinarily offensive or prejudiced is miraculously transformed into something clever, funny and socially relevant, by the assertion that said ordinarily offensive thing is ironic or satirical." As Leslie A. Hahner and Scott J. Varda described it, "those participating in acts of hipster racism understand those acts as racist when practiced by others, but rationalize their own racist performances through a presumed exceptionalism."

History
Carmen Van Kerckhove coined the term hipster racism in the article "The 10 Biggest Race and Pop Culture Trends of 2006", citing "Kill Whitey" Parties and "Blackface Jesus" as examples. "Kill Whitey" parties, as described by The Washington Post, were parties held for hipsters in Williamsburg, Brooklyn, by Jeremy Parker, a disc jockey who goes by the name The Pumpsta, in an attempt to "kill the whiteness inside". These were parties in which white hipsters mocked the black hip-hop industry, and essentially a part of African-American culture, for the sake of irony. Sierra and Bianca Casady of CocoRosie were noted as regulars at "Kill Whitey" parties. Van Kerckhove also regarded the use of blackface by white people and the normalization and acceptance of such use from other individuals as hipster racism. Van Kerckhove contends, quoting Debra Dickerson, that the use of blackface by individuals such as these was an effort to satirize political correctness and racism.

Matt Pearce of the Los Angeles Times characterized the appropriation of cultural artifacts as fashion without recognizing the significance of the article as hipster racism. Examples include wearing Native American headdresses, or more specifically, Urban Outfitters selling clothes with Navajo and other Aboriginal and African tribal prints without giving tribute, acknowledgement, or compensation. Television producer Lena Dunham was described as a hipster racist when Dunham issued a statement defending a male colleague who was accused of rape by a woman of mixed race.

See also 
 Hipster sexism
 Nipster
 Irony

References

Citations

Bibliography

Further reading 

 
 
 
 

2000s fads and trends
Cultural appropriation
Irony
Racism
2000s neologisms
2006 neologisms
Hipster (contemporary subculture)
Alt-right
Blackface minstrelsy
2000s in comedy
Race-related controversies in the United States
2000s controversies in the United States
Culture-related controversies